The Voitinel gas field natural gas field is located near Solca in Suceava County. It was discovered in 2010 and developed by Europa Oil & Gas. It will begin production in 2012 and will produce natural gas and condensates. The total proven reserves of the Voitinel gas field are around 415 billion cubic feet (11.8 km³), and production is slated to be around 106 million cubic feet/day (3×105m³) in 2012.

References

Natural gas fields in Romania